Swinton North (ward) is an electoral ward of Salford, England.  It is represented in Westminster by Rebecca Long-Bailey MP for Salford and Eccles. A profile of the ward conducted by Salford City Council in 2014 recorded a population of 11,473.

The ward is to be abolished following a review by the Local Government Boundary Commission for England

Councillors 
The ward is represented by three councillors: Bill Hinds (Lab), Jim Dawson (Lab), and Derek Antrobus (Lab Co-op)

 indicates seat up for re-election.

Elections in 2010s

May 2018

May 2016

May 2015

May 2014

May 2012

May 2011

May 2010

Elections in 2000s

References 

Salford City Council Wards